The women's 50 metre freestyle S10 event at the 2012 Paralympic Games took place on 31 August, at the London Aquatics Centre.

Three heats were held; one with five swimmers and two with six competitors each. The swimmers with the eight fastest times advanced to the final.

Heats

Final

References

Swimming at the 2012 Summer Paralympics
2012 in women's swimming